Causonis japonica (also known by its synonym Cayratia japonica and common names bushkiller, yabu garashi and Japanese cayratia herb) is the type species of vine plant in its genus and is native to Tropical and Subtropical Asia, Australia and the West Pacific. It is used as a traditional Chinese medicine to relieve swelling and heat, and to enhance diuresis and detoxification.

Description

C. japonica is a perennial herbaceous vine with compound, alternately branching leaves. Tendrils grow opposite each leaf. The leaves have 5 leaflets with dentate margins and a white coloration on the lower surface. The leaflets are arranged in a semi-palmate arrangement with 2 pairs of 2 with 1 singular leaflet with a longer stem in the center. Bushkiller flowers in the late summer with red, white, and yellow flowers developing in umbels and producing grape-like berries with 2-4 seeds. Bushkiller may be confused with Virginia creeper in that they both have leaves with 5 toothed leaflets, but Virginia creeper lacks a petiolule (stem connection a leaflet to the main leaf stem) on any of the leaflets.

As an introduced species

C. japonica has been introduced in tropical areas of the United States including Texas, Louisiana, Mississippi, Alabama, and North Carolina. Bushkiller can out compete native plants and stress native trees by blocking sunlight and weighing down trees. Controlling bushkiller is difficult as it can regenerate from any rhizomes that remain in the soil. Using cutting the stems at the ground and applying a systemic herbicide will often kill the plant.  Composting bushkiller is not recommended as it may re-sprout from buried stems.

References

External links

Vitaceae
Flora of Asia